Moisés Hipólito León (born 15 March 1992) is a Mexican professional footballer. He made his professional debut with Cruz Azul during a Copa MX victory over Lobos BUAP on 23 January 2013.

References

External links
 

1992 births
Living people
Mexican footballers
Association football forwards
Cruz Azul footballers
Cruz Azul Hidalgo footballers
Potros UAEM footballers
Atlético Reynosa footballers
Alebrijes de Oaxaca players
Ascenso MX players
Liga Premier de México players
Tercera División de México players
Footballers from Veracruz
People from Minatitlán, Veracruz